The 7th Tactical Aviation Brigade "Petro Franko" is a formation of the Ukrainian Air Force.

History

The 7th Bomber Aviation Regiment was formed in 1951. In January 1992 the regiment took the oath of loyalty to the Ukrainian people.

On October 2005 the former 32 Independent Reconnaissance Aviation Squadron at Kolminyya joined the brigade as its reconnaissance aviation squadron.

In 2005–2006 the Brigade became first Air Force formation to be composed of professional soldiers and not conscripts.

In August 2019 Su-24M took part in the international air show “Gdynia Aerobaltik 2019” in Poland. The Ukrainian Su-24 bomber has become a participant of the international air show for the first time.

In December 2019 Su-24M from the 7th Tactical Aviation Brigade have completed testing air-to-air docking of the retractable refueling probe for the first time in 20 years. The first flight was successfully performed without refueling.

Components
 Two bomber squadron
 One reconnaissance squadron

Aircraft
On March 2019, the International Institute for Strategic Studies reported that Ukraine fielded 14 Su-24 attack aircraft and 9 Su-24 MR reconnaissance aircraft on operational status.

Another ten unidentified Su-24M/MRs were reported lost during the 2022 Russian invasion of Ukraine:

On 24 February, 2022 a Ukrainian Su-24 was lost in Poltava. Both pilots survived. Another Ukrainian Su-24 was lost in Hostomel; both pilots, Major Dmytro Kulykov and Major Mykola Savchuk, died.

On 2 March, 2022 a Su-24 was shot down near Novohrad-Volynskyi; the pilot, Colonel Mykola Kovalenko, and navigator, Captain Yevhen Kazimirov, died.

On 12 March, 2022 a Su-24 was shot down by Russian forces near Bilyaivka village, Beryslav Raion, Kherson Oblast. The pilots, Valeriy Oshkalo and Roman Chekhun, died.

On 21 March, 2022 a Su-24 piloted by Viacheslav Khodakivskyi was lost near Pokrovsky district, Zaporizhya, Ukraine. The pilot died.

On 30 March, 2022 a Ukrainian Su-24 bomber was shot down in Kirovohrad, Kropyvnytskyi region. The crew from 7th Tactical Aviation Brigade, Maksym Sikalenko, and navigator Kostiantin Horodnychev, were reported dead. The same day another Su-24 was recorded damaged with a trail of smoke in Rivne, western Ukraine on social media.

On 3 April, 2022 a Ukrainian Su-24 bomber was reported destroyed in Ukraine. Footage of the crash site showed the wreck of an AL-21 engine, used in the Su-24.

On 19 May, 2022 a Su-24 from the 7th Tactical Aviation Brigade was lost near Pylove. The pilots, Lt. Colonel Ihor Khmara and navigator Mayor Illia Nehar, died.

On 26 June, 2022 a Ukrainian Su-24MR piloted by the Commander of the 40th Tactical Aviation Brigade Colonel Mykhailo Matiushenko and an unidentified Major was lost during a military mission on Snake Island, Black Sea. Both crewmen died.

On 29 September, 2022 a Ukrainian Su-24 was hit by Russian surface-to-air missile in Kherson Oblast. The aircraft was recorded on video with one of its engines on fire before it crashed. The pilots managed to eject.

References

External links
Holm, 7th Bomber Aviation Regiment, accessed August 2011

Air force brigades of Ukraine
Military units and formations established in 1951
1951 establishments in the Soviet Union